The Erinnerungsstätte für die Freiheitsbewegungen in der deutschen Geschichte (literally Memorial site for freedom movements in German history) is a museum and memorial to free democratic traditions in Germany. It is housed in the Schloss Rastatt (chosen due to the town of Rastatt being a key site in the Baden Revolution and the Revolutions of 1848 in the German states) and known as the Freiheitsmuseum (Freedom Museum) for short.

It was opened on 26 June 1974 by president Gustav Heinemann. It is overseen and owned by the German Federal Archives and is a central stopping-point on the 'Democracy Way' from Frankfurt to Lörrach. It has also mounted exhibitions on various topics, with permanent displays on:
 Freedom movements in the early modern period
 Social issues
 Between Two Revolutions: 1789–1848
 The March Revolution 1848
 Die Deutsche Nationalversammlung 1848/49
 Fundamental rights
 The Struggle on the Reichsverfassung 1849
 The long road to democracy: 1850–1918
 Freedom-fighters who emigrated
 Germany 1918–1945 - Resistance in Nazi Germany
 The "Weiße Rose"
 Germany 1945–1990 - Resistance in the Soviet Zone and East Germany
 Gustav W. Heinemann and Rastatt

External links 
Bundesarchiv - microsite

History museums in Germany
Museums in Baden-Württemberg
Museums established in 1974